Valea Glodului may refer to several villages in Romania:

 Valea Glodului, a village in Valea Largă Commune, Mureș County
 Valea Glodului, a village in Vulturești Commune, Suceava County